Series 12 of Top Gear, a British motoring magazine and factual television programme, was broadcast in the United Kingdom on BBC Two during 2008, consisting of seven episodes that were aired between 2 November and 14 December. This series' highlights included the presenters tackling the task of driving lorries, investigating car-tuning, an fuel-economy race, the first power test by James May, and a review of cars made during the Cold War era. After the series concluded, a feature-length special for Christmas, titled Top Gear: Vietnam Special, was aired on 28 December 2008, focusing on the presenters travelling across Vietnam with motorcycles.

A series of compilation episodes featuring the best moments of the eleventh and twelfth series, titled "Best of Top Gear", were aired during 2009, between 1 January and 1 February. The twelfth series faced two sets of criticism, one for an unacceptable joke referencing a major crime in 2006, and the other questioning the review of a car by Jeremy Clarkson in regards to his comments on its quality.

Episodes

Best-of Episodes

Criticism and Controversy

HGV Challenge "Prostitutes" joke
During the first episode of the series, Jeremy Clarkson made a joke regarding lorry drivers killing prostitutes. Following the episode's broadcast, the joke drew criticism, with many believing that it alluded to the Ipswich 2006 serial murders in which a forklift truck driver was arrested and charged with the murder of five women who had been working as prostitutes, though some believe it was more likely that Clarkson was referring to the Yorkshire Ripper. Ofcom received over 500 complaints in regards to the joke, but revealed that the remark had not been in breach of the broadcasting code. Meanwhile, Labour MP Chris Mole wrote a strongly worded letter to the BBC, stating that Clarkson should be sacked regarding the remarks he made.

Tesla Roadster review film
During the seventh episode, Top Gear reviewed and tested the battery powered Tesla Roadster (2008), in which Clarkson pointed out, upon rigorous testing, that the batteries on the Roadster drained quickly and that the car suffered mechanical problems. Tesla contested these findings following the episode, and provided data logs of the cars' performances during the show to Top Gear and the BBC, which led both to revealing in statements to the media, that the cars did not in fact break down and never went below 20 percent state of charge. Despite this, Clarkson wrote an article for The Sunday Times, following dozens of blogs and newspapers challenging Top Gear's portrayal of the Roadster's performance, in which he stood by the contents of the episode.

References

2008 British television seasons
Top Gear seasons